Beacon Academy is a coeducational secondary school sponsored by the Wellspring Academy Trust, in Cleethorpes, North East Lincolnshire.

Beacon Academy opened on 1 September 2017. The Wellspring Academy Trust was granted sponsorship of the academy on 1 March 2017.

The academy is situated in the Beacon Hill area of Cleethorpes.

History
The following predecessor schools have existed on the school site(s):

Matthew Humberstone School (1823–1882).

Clee Grammar School for Boys (1882–1973). Beacon Hill Secondary Modern School also existed on the Chatsworth Place site during this period.

Matthew Humberstone Church of England School (1973–2010).

St.Andrew’s College (2010–2013).

Holy Family Catholic Academy (2013–2017).

Ofsted ratings
Holy Family Catholic Academy was graded ‘Good’ by OFSTED in a full, Section 5 Inspection in June 2015.

Following a short, Section 8, OFSTED inspection on 6 February 2019, Beacon Academy’s status remained as ‘Good’.

Following a full, Section 5, OFSTED inspection on 3–4 March 2020. Beacon Academy’s status remained as ‘Good’. In the new OFSTED Inspection Framework, Beacon was graded ‘Good’ for overall effectiveness. The academy was graded ‘Good’ in all 4 inspection categories.

References

External links 
 
 
Archived Holy Family Catholic Academy website

Secondary schools in the Borough of North East Lincolnshire
Cleethorpes
Academies in the Borough of North East Lincolnshire
Catholic secondary schools in the Diocese of Nottingham